Zosne cincticornis is a species of longhorn beetle in the tribe Saperdini in the genus Zosne that was discovered by Pascoe in 1866.

References

Saperdini
Beetles described in 1866